The 1992 Individual Speedway Junior World Championship was the 16th edition of the World motorcycle speedway Under-21 Championships. The event was won by Leigh Adams of Australia.

World final
August 23, 1992
 Pfaffenhofen an der Ilm, Speedway Stadion Pfaffenhofen

References

1992
World Individual U-21
Individual Speedway
Speedway competitions in Germany